Tajnosľubná is a duet by Marika Gombitová and Miro Žbirka, released on Universal Music in 2005.

The song was written by the male vocalist and appeared on his thirteenth studio album entitled Dúhy (2005). In addition, the composition was attached to Gombitová's double greatest hits album Vyznanie (2007), and along with their previously recorded duets, such as "V slepých uličkách" (from 1980) and "Nespáľme to krásne v nás" (from 2001).

Eventually, "Tajnosľubná" charted on the Czech component airplay chart at number thirty-five.

Official versions
 "Tajnosľubná" - Original version, 2005

Credits and personnel
 Marika Gombitová - lead vocal
 Miro Žbirka - lead vocal, writer
 Honza Horáček - producer
 Kamil Peteraj - lyrics

Charts

References

General

Specific

External links 
 

2005 songs
Marika Gombitová songs
Songs written by Kamil Peteraj
Slovak-language songs